Lappeenranta is a city and municipality in the region of South Karelia, about  from the Russian border and  from the town of Vyborg (Viipuri). It is situated on the shore of the Lake Saimaa in southeastern Finland, and is one of the most significant urban centers in the whole Saimaa region, along with the towns of Imatra, Mikkeli and Savonlinna. With approximately   inhabitants Lappeenranta is the  largest city in Finland, after incorporating the previous municipalities of Lappee and Lauritsala in 1967, Nuijamaa in 1989, Joutseno in 2009, and Ylämaa in 2010.

Lappeenranta, the region's centre for tourism, is the second most visited city by Russian tourists in Finland after Helsinki and it competes with Helsinki for the largest share of tax-free sales in Finland. Lappeenranta is a model for renewable energies and a clean living environment. Lappeenranta was the only Finnish city among the 14 finalists in the international Earth Hour City Challenge 2014, organized by WWF. In 2009, Lappeenranta was rated the fourth best in the comparison of the largest Finnish cities, while in the 2008 survey Lappeenranta was ranked fifth. In a survey conducted in 2011 for business representatives, Lappeenranta ranked 17th among Finnish cities in terms of image.

Opened in 1918, Lappeenranta Airport, located in the center of the city, is the oldest airport still in operation in Finland.

History 

Pollen analysis has shown that the modern-day municipality of Lappeenranta has been continuously inhabited for at least 2,000 years. Lappeenranta's original core settlement, Lapvesi, later Lappee, was originally formed around a headland jutting into Lake Saimaa, the site of the present fortress. The public market was established here, which became so important as a trading place that general Governor Count Per Brahe the Younger proposed that the Swedish government should grant town privileges to Lapvesi. The town was chartered in 1649 by Queen Christina of Sweden. At the time, Lapvesi was an important port for tar.

Between 1721 and 1743, Lappeenranta was the capital of Kymmenegård and Nyslott County and during this period the Swedes built the fortress out in stages.

In 1741, the Battle of Villmanstrand was fought between the Swedish and Russian armies in the Russo-Swedish War of 1741–1743. The battle ended in a Russian victory. The town was pillaged, wooden structures including the provincial chancellery were burnt and the ecclesiastical archives damaged. Lappeenranta, along with a portion of Old Finland, was ceded by Sweden to Russia per the Treaty of Turku. Following the creation of the Grand Duchy of Finland in 1809, Old Finland (including Lappeenranta) was joined to the Grand Duchy in 1812 as a gesture of goodwill by Alexander I of Russia.

Lappeenranta incorporated the neighbouring municipalities of Lappee and Lauritsala on 1 January 1967, Nuijamaa on 1 January 1989, Joutseno on 1 January 2009, and Ylämaa on 1 January 2010.

Etymology
The name Lappeenranta consists of the genitive of Lappee (the name of the original core town) and the common noun ranta which means "shore". The history of Lappeenranta includes the rural municipality of Lappee and the hundred Lapvesi. The Swedish name Villmanstrand contains the words vildman meaning "wild-man" and strand also meaning "shore". A wild-man is depicted on Lappeenranta's coat of arms.

Geography
Located on the southern shore of Lake Saimaa, Lappeenranta's neighboring municipalities on the Finnish side are Imatra, Lemi, Luumäki, Miehikkälä, Ruokolahti and Taipalsaari, and on the Russian side, the neighbors are Seleznjovo, Svetogorsk and Kamennogorsk.

Climate 
It currently has a humid continental climate of the warm-summer type (Köppen: Dfb), formerly in the continental subarctic zone (Dfc) on older data. The summers are longer, although rarely hot, and usually warm. Some of the warmest summers in the country can be found here, due to its orientation: southern but inland. Being in an eastern part of Finland, the winters are often harsh but still mild.

Anchorage has some similarities by being of marine influence of hot currents and at the same time of the marginal continentality. But Lappeenranta is still able to receive heat waves that cross Central Europe in a warmer climate than cool.

Climate changes 
Between 2000 and 2017 the temperature change was greater than the whole previous century, with +1.2 °C (higher values than Helsinki or Oulu). Since 2000 the number of warm days (> 24 °C) has become 2 per year, while the 1900 data indicates only 2 days per decade. From the first half of the twentieth century the days above 24 °C changed from rare to occasional in the second half to regular in the present century. There was also a 17.5 decrease in temperature below -1 °C for the same comparison period. 2015 was the hottest year since 1900. Having one of the less than 50 days with freezing days. Work to reduce the temperature increase has been carried out, the city is again among the best 45 cities in the world in the WWF City Challenge 2016. One of the goals is to reduce carbon dioxide by 30% by 2020 and zero emissions by 2050.

Economy 
The city's main employers are the:
 City of Lappeenranta
 Fazer
 Lappeenranta University of Technology
 Nordkalk
 Paroc
 Metso Outotec
 South Karelia Social and Health Care District
 The Armed Forces
 UPM-Kymmene
 VR Group

Tourism 

Lappeenranta is known as a summer city, mostly due to its closeness to the Lake Saimaa. Europe's 4th largest lake. The eponymous GoSaimaa (www.gosaimaa.com) provides all the touristic activities in the area. In addition, its inland location means that summers tend to be warmer and winters colder than along the coastal areas.

Lappeenranta does have a healthy winter tourism industry. Various cabins around Lake Saimaa, as well as numerous snowmobiles, Nordic skating, floating in the river, reindeer rides, paragliding, skiing and sledding tracks draw a fair number of winter visitors.

The proximity of the Russian border is increasingly evident in the number of Russian tourists visiting the city. In fact, Lappeenranta is closer to Saint Petersburg than it is to Helsinki, the capital of Finland. The presence of Russian tourists is noticeable by the many Russian registered cars on the streets and the use of Cyrillic letters in signs of some shops.

Places and events
 The old fortress, with a number of museums, cafés and the oldest Russian Orthodox church in Finland. 
 St. Mary's Church of Lappee, an 18th-century wooden church in the center of the city.
 The harbour area, with cruises to Vyborg and the nearby Saimaa Canal.
 The central market place, where you can enjoy the local specialities, such as meat pies known as "Atomi" (atom) or "Vety" (hydrogen).
 The Night of The Fortess, a two-day cultural festival held in early August.
 The Lappeenranta Ballet Gala in late August.
 The annual Lappeenranta National Singing Contest.
 The biggest sand castle in Finland is built next to Port of Lappeenranta every summer.
 There are three private cinema theatres in Lappeenranta: Kino-Aula, Nuijamies and Finnkino.
 Major league home games in ice-hockey (SaiPa), basketball (Namika Lappeenranta) and other sports.
 The IIHF World Championship Under 18, in 2014
 Unlimited Racing Event, on 27 and 29 June 2014

Sports

Lappeenranta has several sports teams playing in top levels of Finnish sports leagues.

SaiPa is an Ice hockey team playing in the highest level in Finland, SM-liiga. SaiPa was fourth in the national Ice hockey league in the season of 2013–2014.
2014 IIHF Ice Hockey U18 World Championship - Tournament was played Kisapuisto Ice Hall, Lappeenranta & Imatra Ice Hall during 17–27 April 2014. United States won the tournament, Czech Republic was second and Canada was the third.

Lappeenrannan NMKY is a basketball team playing in the highest level in Korisliiga and have won two championships in 2005 and 2006.

NST plays floorball in the Salibandyliiga and Rajaritarit is an American football team in the Vaahteraliiga.

Lappeenrannan Veiterä, or just Veiterä, plays in Bandyliiga and has been Finnish champions five times, including in 2017. They have been the champions for women and for girls born in 1995 and 1998. The city hosted the first ever Women's Bandy World Championship in 2004 and in 2014 the tournament was again played in Lappeenranta. The Old Boys World Cup is annually hosted in town, in 2017 for the seventh time.

In women's sports Catz Lappeenranta plays basketball and Pesä Ysit plays Finnish baseball, both in the top leagues of the nation. Catz has won Finnish national basketball championship four times in a row.

Transport 

Lappeenranta is connected to neighbouring cities and municipalities by road. From Lappeenranta, the distance to Joensuu, the capital of North Karelia, is  along Highway 6.

There are multiple daily train departures to destinations within Finland from the Lappeenranta and Joutseno stations and to Russia from Vainikkala station. The Allegro train service operating between Helsinki and St. Petersburg stops in Vainikkala, a village in Lappeenranta. The journey time to Helsinki is about 2 hours and St. Petersburg about 1.5 hours.

During the summer, when Lake Saimaa and the Saimaa Canal are accessible by water, there is a visa-free connection by ship from Lappeenranta to Vyborg, Russia.

The regionally owned Lappeenranta Airport is located west of the city center. The airport predominantly serves charter flights to southern Europe, the Canary Islands and Madeira.

The public transport is by bus and is called Jouko.  The Jouko-buses are pink-colored and they serve 12 sub-urban lines (1, 1Z, 2, 2H, 3, 3K, 4, 5, 7, 8, 12 and 47) and 21 regional lines (100, 101, 110, 111, 112, 113, 114, 120, 121, 130, 131, 200, 201, 300, 301, 500, 601, 602, 603, 610, 620). Jouko has Waltti-travel card, to which you can charge a 30-day season ticket (travel zones A-D) or a value tickets, which works also in  other finnish cities which do have the Waltti-ticket system. Other ways to buy a ticket in Jouko-buses are single tickets (payment with cash or credit card), mobile-tickets (PayIQ, etc.) and 24-hour ticket. Jouko has also own route-guide (https://lappeenranta.digitransit.fi/), where you can plan a route, see timetables and also see all the Jouko-buses in the map. You can also view delays, exceptions, and other releases. Jouko sub-urban transport is operated by Savonlinja. Regional lines are operated by Savonlinja, Rantanen, Vento and Mikkonen. The bus fleet consists of low-floor city buses, and the bus models are Scania Lahti Scala (9 units) (ones in Jouko-traffic built in 2010 and 2012), Volvo 8900 (7 units) (ones in Jouko-traffic built in 2014, 2015, 2016, 2017 and 2019) and Scania Citywide (3 units) (CNG-powered ones built in 2018 and diesel-powered one built in 2020).

Jouko sub-urban routes 
 1 University-Sammonlahti-Kourula-Leiri-City center-Central hospital-Lauritsala-Kanavansuu-Kiiskinmäki
 1Z University-Sammonlahti-Kourula-Leiri-City center
 2 Kivisalmi-Voisalmi-City center-Harapainen-Lauritsala-Hakali-Hovinpelto (on sundays via central hospital)
 2H Hovinpelto-Hakali-Lauritsala-Central hospital-Railway station-Leiri-City center
 3 Kivisalmi-Kariniemi-Pikisaari-City center-Railway station-Leiri
 3K Kivisalmi-City center-Leiri-Railway station-Family Center
 4 Mäntylä-Leiri-City center-Kiviharju-Karhuvuori
 5 University-Sammonlahti-Kourula-Leiri-City center-Lepola-Railway station
 7 Mustola-Hakali-Lauritsala-Central hospital-City center
 8 Kariniemi-Pikisaari-City center-Leiri-Huhtiniemi-Kourula-Ruoholampi-Rutola
 12 University-City center/Kivisalmi-City center/City center-Karhuvuori-Lauritsala-Hovinpelto-Mustola-Kiiskinmäki/Kiiskinmäki-Kanavansuu-Lauritsala-City center
 47 Mäntylä-Leiri-City center-Kiviharju-Karhuvuori-Lauritsala-Mustola

Education 
Lappeenranta is known as an international university city in Finland with LUT University and LAB University of Applied Sciences which together have approximately 13,000 students from 68 countries. Lappeenranta is also a commercial centre of South-East Finland and the meeting point of the EU and Russia,  from both Helsinki and St. Petersburg.

Lappeenranta has numerous schools at almost all levels of education, including the LUT University, LAB University of Applied Sciences, located in a shared Skinnarila campus of around 8000 students, the Army Academy (branch of the Finnish Defence Forces), South Karelia Vocational College and South Karelia Adult Education Centre.

Notable people 
 Antti Aalto – former ice-hockey player
 Koop Arponen – singer and winner of the fourth series of the Idols in 2008
 Ivan Fedotov - Finnish-born Russian professional ice hockey goaltender
 Kaarlo Halttunen – former actor
 Laila Hirvisaari (formerly Laila Hietamies) – novelist, has written a novel series about Lappeenranta and its people
 Horna – Finnish black metal band
 Kari Jormakka – philosopher, architect, architecture theorist
 Kotiteollisuus – hard rock band
 Matti Lehtinen – operatic baritone
 Pave Maijanen – musician
 Miikka Multaharju – football player
 Jukka Paarma – former Archbishop of Turku and Finland
 Tiia Piili – gymnast
 Saku Puhakainen – football player
 Jaska Raatikainen - drummer of the band Children of Bodom
 Jaana Savolainen - cross country skier
 Sargeist - Finnish black metal band
 Satanic Warmaster –  Finnish black metal band
 Petri Skriko – retired ice-hockey player in the NHL in USA
 Juha Tiainen – former Olympic gold medallist in hammer throw
 Mokoma – thrash metal band
 Battlelore - symphonic metal band
 Hanna Pakarinen – the first Idols winner in Finland came from Lappeenranta
 Christian Ruuttu – former ice hockey player in the NHL 
 Vesa Vierikko – Finnish actor
 Vesa Viitakoski – former ice hockey player in SM-liiga

In media
Lappeenranta is the setting for Bordertown, the Finnish police drama broadcast by Netflix.

Twin towns – sister cities

Lappeenranta is twinned with:

 Rakvere, Estonia 
 Stykkishólmur, Iceland
 Drammen, Norway
 Örebro, Sweden
 Kolding, Denmark
 Klin, Russia
 Schwäbisch Hall, Germany
 Szombathely, Hungary
 Lake Worth Beach, Florida, US
 Chernihiv, Ukraine

See also
 Imatra
 Joensuu
 Saimaa Canal

References

External links 

 
 Official tourism site
 Official Saimaa tourism site

 
Cities and towns in Finland
Inland port cities and towns in Finland
Grand Duchy of Finland
1649 establishments in Sweden
Populated places established in 1649
Populated lakeshore places in Finland